Acrolophus arcanella (grass tubeworm moth) is a moth of the family Acrolophidae. It is found in eastern North America.

The wingspan is about 25 mm.

References

Moths described in 1859
arcanella